The Madagascar national football team, nicknamed Barea after the island's zebu, is the national team of Madagascar and is controlled by the Malagasy Football Federation. It has never qualified for the finals of the World Cup. It took part in its first Africa Cup of Nations in 2019. Among its biggest wins was a 1–0 home victory over Egypt in the qualification rounds of the 2004 Africa Cup of Nations until being surpassed by a recent 2–0 win over Nigeria in the group stage of the 2019 Africa Cup of Nations. Reflecting the official name of the country at the time, the team was known as the Malagasy Republic national football team between 1958 and 1975.

History
Madagascar made its debut in 1947 in a home match against Mauritius which was lost 2–1. The game was part of a Triangulaire tournament between Madagascar, Mauritius and Reunion. Madagascar's second match was at home to Reunion and saw their first ever win, 4–2. The triangular tournament was staged every year until 1958, and Madagascar's highest-scoring game was on 13 July 1953 when they beat Reunion 6–4 at home. Their worst loss was on 31 July 1952 when they lost 7–0 to Mauritius in Reunion.

Madagascar played against opposition different from Mauritius or Reunion for the first time in 1960, as part of a tournament between French-speaking nations held on the island. In their first match on 15 April 1960 they beat the Upper Volta (now Burkina Faso) 6–1. The second game was a quarter-final against France's amateur side on 17 April and was lost 2–1. On 19 April Madagascar beat the Congo 8–1 in the third-place play-off.

In April 1963, Madagascar entered another competition for French-speaking countries, this time in Senegal, and was placed in a group with Dahomey (now Benin), Liberia and Chad. They opened with a 1–0 win over Dahomey on 11 April, and then beat Chad 2–1 on 13 April and Liberia 3–1 on 15 April. In the semi-finals, Madagascar were beaten 2–1 by Tunisia on 19 April, and then lost 4–1 to France's amateur team in the third-place play-off on 21 April.

In September 1963 the Triangulaire between Madagascar, Reunion and Mauritius was reinstated for the first time since 1958. On 15 September they beat Reunion 6–1 at home, and on 18 September drew 1–1 to Mauritius in a home game which was abandoned.

On 16 October 2018, Madagascar qualified to the 2019 Africa Cup of Nations for the first time in their history, after they won 1–0 against Equatorial Guinea. During their debut match against Guinea on 22 June 2019, Anicet Abel scored Madagascar's first-ever AFCON goal and secured their first point of the competition with a 2–2 draw against Guinea. The team defeated Burundi in their second match and followed it up with a 2–0 victory over the Super Eagles of Nigeria to top Group B. Then Madagascar advanced to quarter-finals after beating DR Congo in the round of 16. The team's successful performance was coined by pundits as the Iceland of Africa, resembling the shockingly successful debut of Iceland in UEFA Euro 2016. However, Madagascar's dream ended abruptly after suffering a 0–3 defeat at the hand of another former champion, Tunisia.

Results and fixtures
The following is a list of match results in the last 12 months, as well as any future matches that have been scheduled.

2022

2023

Coaching history

 Peter Schnittger (1978–1985)
 Justin Rasoloharimahefa (1994)
 Claude "Ntsoa" Ravelomanantsoa (–2001)
 Vincent Randriamirado (2001)
 Jeremia Randriambololona (2001)
 Hans Heiniger (2002–2003)
 Hervé Arsène (2007–2008)
 Mickael Nivoson Andrianasy (2008)
 Jeremia Randriambololona (2008)
 Jean-Paul Rabier (2010–2011)
 Mosa (2011)
 Frank Rajaonarisamba (2011–2012)
 Auguste Raux (2012–2014)
 Frank Rajaonarisamba (2014–2016)
 Auguste Raux (2016–2017)
 Nicolas Dupuis (2017–2021)
 Éric Rabésandratana (2021–2022)
 Nicolas Dupuis (2022–present)

Players

Current squad
The following players were called up for the 2023 AFCON qualification matches against Central African Republic on 23 and 27 March 2023.

Caps and goals updated after the match against Angola on 5 June 2022.

Recent call-ups
The following players have been called up for Madagascar in the last year.

DEC Player refused to join the team after the call-up.
INJ Player withdrew from the squad due to an injury.
PRE Preliminary squad.
RET Player has retired from international football.
SUS Suspended from the national team.

Records

Players in bold are still active with Madagascar.

Most appearances

Top goalscorers

Competitive record

FIFA World Cup

Africa Cup of Nations

African Nations Championship

African Games

Indian Ocean Island Games

COSAFA Cup

References

External links

 Malagasy Football Federation 
 Madagascar national football team picture

 
African national association football teams